The 2021 F4 Japanese Championship season was the seventh season of the F4 Japanese Championship. It held a total of 14 races over four double-header rounds and two triple-header rounds.

Teams and drivers
All teams were Japanese-registered.

Race calendar and results 
All rounds were held in Japan and support the Super GT events. The revised calendar was published on 10 February 2021. The second round of the championship at Suzuka Circuit was postponed from 29–30 May to 21–22 August due to COVID-19 pandemic. The nomenclature was kept, despite the round at Twin Ring Motegi being held in the meantime.

Championship standings 
Points were awarded as follows:

Drivers' standings

Independent Cup

Teams' standings 
Only the best finisher scored points for their team.

Notes

References

External links 

  

Japanese F4 Championship seasons
Japanese
F4 Japanese Championship
Japan